Lynn Wilbur "The Saint" St. John (November 18, 1876 – September 30, 1950) was an American football, basketball, and baseball coach and college athletics administrator. The Union City, Pennsylvania native was the head basketball coach at Ohio State University from 1911 to 1919, and served as the school's second athletic director, a position he held for 33 years. He also served on the NCAA Rules Committee along with James Naismith from 1912 to 1937).  In 1956, Ohio State built a new basketball arena and named it St. John Arena after him. In 1962, he was inducted to the Naismith Memorial Basketball Hall of Fame as a contributor.

References

External links
 

1876 births
1950 deaths
American men's basketball coaches
American football running backs
Basketball coaches from Pennsylvania
College of Wooster alumni
Naismith Memorial Basketball Hall of Fame inductees
National Collegiate Basketball Hall of Fame inductees
Ohio State Buckeyes athletic directors
Ohio State Buckeyes baseball coaches
Ohio State Buckeyes men's basketball coaches
Ohio Wesleyan Battling Bishops baseball coaches
Ohio Wesleyan Battling Bishops football coaches
Ohio Wesleyan Battling Bishops men's basketball coaches
People from Erie County, Pennsylvania
Players of American football from Pennsylvania
Wooster Fighting Scots football coaches
Wooster Fighting Scots men's basketball coaches